Ann-Margret Nirling (later Olsson, 1 February 1918 – 3 February 1999) was a Swedish diver. She competed in the 10 m platform at the 1936 Summer Olympics and finished tenth. Two years later she won a silver medal in this event at the 1938 European Championships.

References

1918 births
1999 deaths
Swedish female divers
Olympic divers of Sweden
Divers at the 1936 Summer Olympics
Stockholms KK divers
Divers from Stockholm